South Pacific Playground is a 1953 Australian documentary directed by Ken G. Hall. It is a travelogue of Sydney beach suburbs, in particular Manly.

It was released as a supporting featurette in some cinemas.

Reception
The Catholic Weekly wrote that:
The film has some faults. Its beautiful photography is marred several times by glare, and also by the motion of the camera. Sensitive ears will not take kindly to a bad grammatical error the commentator makes at one stage. And perhaps some will grow tired of looking at the same girls parading in front of the camera. But for all that it is a beautiful piece of work. One feels there are many other places in our country waiting for the cameraman to do justice to them.

References

External links

Australian documentary films